The Grand Harbour is a natural harbour on the island of Malta.

Grand Harbour or Grand Harbor may also refer to:

 Grand Harbour (Toronto), a condominium community in Ontario, Canada
 Grand Harbour, New Brunswick, a community on Grand Manan Island, Canada
 Grand Harbor Resort and Waterpark, Dubuque, Iowa, United States

See also
 Grand Harbor Press, an imprint of Amazon Publishing
 Harbor (disambiguation)